Proletären (meaning "the proletarian"; in full Marxist-leninist Proletären) is a Swedish Marxist-Leninist weekly newspaper published by the Communist Party.

History and profile
Proletären was founded in 1970. About a third of the paper is sold in the streets.

Many notable Swedes, such as Jan Myrdal, Peter Birro and Sven Wollter, who is a member of the Communist Party, have had their articles published in Proletären.

Proletären had a circulation of 3,200 copies in 2013.

See also
Proletarian

References

External links

1970 establishments in Sweden
Communist newspapers published in Sweden
Mass media in Gothenburg
Publications established in 1970
Swedish-language newspapers
Weekly newspapers published in Sweden
Propaganda in Sweden